

Bellona–Gittings Historic District is a national historic district located at Baltimore, Maryland.

It was listed on the National Register of Historic Places in 2008.

The resources of the district total 449, which includes 374 residences, associated garages, and one commercial property which is a one story brick store building used for a neighborhood pharmacy and wine store. The architecture of this building harmonizes with the surrounding buildings. Of these resources, 395 are contributing and are characterized by a high level of architectural integrity. Most of the 54 noncontributing resources were constructed later than the period of significance.

See also
 Bellona–Gittings, Baltimore neighborhood

References

External links

 at Maryland Historical Trust
Boundary Map of the Bellona–Gittings Historic District, Baltimore, at Maryland Historical Trust

Historic districts on the National Register of Historic Places in Baltimore
Gothic Revival architecture in Maryland
Colonial Revival architecture in Maryland
Tudor Revival architecture in Maryland
Northern Baltimore